Gaulstown Barrow  is a round barrow (bowl barrow) and National Monument located in County Meath, Ireland.

Location

Description
Gaulstown Barrow is a circular bowl barrow built over a tomb, probably dating to the late Neolithic or early Bronze Age.

References

Archaeological sites in County Meath
National Monuments in County Meath